A tonga or tanga   is a light carriage or curricle drawn by one horse (compare ekka) used for transportation in the Indian subcontinent. They have a canopy over the carriage with a single pair of large wheels. The passengers reach the seats from the rear while the driver sits in front of the carriage. Some space is available for baggage below the carriage, between the wheels. This space is often used to carry hay for the horses.

Tangas were popular before the advent of automobiles and are still in use in some parts of the Indian subcontinent. They are a popular mode of transportation because they are fun to ride in, and are usually cheaper to hire than a taxi or rickshaw. However, in many cities, tangas are not allowed to use highways because of their slow pace. In Pakistan, tangas are mainly found in the older parts of cities and towns, and are becoming less popular for utilitarian travel and more popular for pleasure. Tangas have become a traditional feature of weddings and other social functions in parts of the Indian subcontinent.

In India, tangas are also found in rural areas of North India like Uttar Pradesh, Rajasthan, Madhya Pradesh, and Punjab. Apart from the modern modes of transport, tangas still offer services at the entrance of bus stops and railway stations to transport luggage and passengers to their destinations in small towns of North India. The culture of the tanga is disappearing due to the speed of modern transportation and the earnings people make. However, there are still some that continue to support themselves and keep the tradition alive. Tourists who come to India still take rides in tangas to experience their Indian charm. They are still among the most appreciated experiences of North India.

See also
Jugaad
Rickshaw
Carriage
Horse-drawn vehicle

References

Carriages
Animal-powered vehicles
Road transport in Pakistan
History of transport in India
Transport culture of India